The University of Central Florida (UCF) is a public research university whose main campus is in unincorporated Orange County, Florida. UCF also has nine smaller regional campuses throughout central Florida. It is part of the State University System of Florida. With 68,442 students as of the Fall 2022 semester, UCF has the second-largest student body of any public university in the United States. UCF is classified among "R1: Doctoral Universities – Very high research activity" and is accredited by the Commission on Colleges of the Southern Association of Colleges and Schools.

UCF was founded in 1963 and opened in 1968 as Florida Technological University, with the mission to provide personnel to support the growing U.S. space program at the Kennedy Space Center and Cape Canaveral Space Force Station on Florida's Space Coast. As its academic scope expanded beyond engineering and technology, Florida Tech was renamed the University of Central Florida in 1978. UCF's space roots continue, as it leads the NASA Florida Space Grant Consortium. Initial enrollment was 1,948 students; enrollment in 2022 exceeds 68,000 students from over 150 countries, all 50 states and Washington, D.C.

UCF offers more than 230 degrees through 13 colleges at 10 regional campuses in Central Florida, including the Health Sciences Campus at Lake Nona Medical City, the Rosen College of Hospitality Management in south Orlando and the UCF Center for Emerging Media in downtown Orlando. Since its founding, UCF has awarded more than 346,000 degrees, including over 60,000 graduate and professional degrees.

Its official colors are black and gold, and the university logo is Pegasus, which "symbolizes the university's vision of limitless possibilities". The university's intercollegiate sports teams, known as the UCF Knights and represented by mascot Knightro, compete in NCAA Division I and the American Athletic Conference.

History

Founding
Following President John F. Kennedy's September 1962 speech "We choose to go to the moon", in which he described his goal of accomplishing a crewed space flight to the moon by the end of the decade, the space program grew in importance and scope in Central Florida because of its proximity to Cape Canaveral. Prominent residents and local leaders began lobbying the Florida State Legislature to increase access to higher education on the Space Coast. With the help of former state senate president William A. Shands and Senator Beth Johnson, on June 10, 1963, the legislature passed and Governor Farris Bryant signed into law Senate Bill No. 125, which authorized the Florida Board of Regents to create a new state university in East Central Florida. The university was founded as a non-segregated and coeducational university, with the mission of educating students for space-age careers in engineering and other technological professions. Defense scientists and NASA met with students, recruiting for the space program. 

On January 24, 1964, the Board of Regents purchased  of remote forest and pasture land along Alafaya Trail (SR 434) in northeast Orlando for $500,000 as the site of the new university. Local residents donated another , and raised more than $1 million in funds to secure the land acquisition. In December 1965, the Board of Regents appointed Charles Millican the first president of the new university. With the consultation of a citizen advisory group, Millican chose the name Florida Technological University, as well as co-designed the school's distinctive Pegasus seal. Millican is also responsible for the university's slogan, "Reach for the Stars", for the two key principles of the school, "accent on excellence" and "accent on the individual", and for the campus's unique pedestrian-oriented concentric-circle layout, which was based on plans by Walt Disney and has become a model for other universities. Millican and then-Governor Claude Kirk presided over FTU's groundbreaking in March 1967. On October 7, 1968, the inaugural classes were held in the school's first academic building. 1,948 students were enrolled in 55 degree programs within five colleges, led by 90 instructors and aided by 150 staff members, during the university's first year. FTU graduated its first class of 423 seniors on June 14, 1970, with astronaut and Orlando native John Young giving the commencement address.

Millican selected the university's official colors, and had a role in selecting its first mascot, the Citronaut, a mix of an orange and an astronaut. The Citronaut proved unpopular, so in 1969 the student newspaper, The Central Florida Future, encouraged mascot suggestions from students and faculty. The search for a replacement proved unsuccessful until 1970, when Judy Hines, a night nurse, proposed Vincent the Vulture. He served as the university's unofficial mascot for more than a year. In late 1971, students voted and selected the Knight of Pegasus as the school's official athletic mascot. The nickname later evolved to the Golden Knights and eventually to the Knights. 

After retiring as president in 1978, Millican identified his proudest moment leading the school as when President Richard Nixon delivered the university's spring 1973 commencement address.

Expansion
Entering office in 1978, the university's second president, Trevor Colbourn, recognized the diversification and growth of UCF's academic programs away from its strictly technological and scientific beginnings.  As the university developed strong business, education, and liberal arts programs, Colbourn recognized the university's name no longer recognized its mission. From its establishment the university was known as Florida Technological University, nicknamed Florida Tech, until December 1978 when Governor Reubin Askew signed legislation changing the school's name to the University of Central Florida.

Colbourn established the university's honors program, and started the university's first satellite branch campus. In addition, he was responsible for constructing the Central Florida Research Park adjacent to the UCF campus, founded in 1978. The park serves as a major focus of simulation for space and defense-related research. It was part of Colbourn's plan to make UCF a world-class partnership university. Among the university's first partners were Lockheed Martin and the United States Navy, and Colbourn led the push to found both the Institute for Simulation and Training and the Center for Research and Education in Optics and Lasers in 1986. During his tenure, enrollment increased from 11,000 in 1978 to over 18,000 in 1989. Colbourn also supported the university's athletic programs. He was responsible for establishing the school's football program in 1979, which began an era of growth for the university. In April 1979, UCF awarded its 15,000th degree.

Hitt presidency

In March 1992, John C. Hitt became UCF's fourth president, ushering in an era of unprecedented growth and prominence for the university. Once known mainly as a small commuter and technology school, in recent years UCF has undertaken an effort to increase its academic and research standing while also evolving into a more traditional research university. When Hitt took office, UCF's enrollment was 20,302. As of 2014, 60,821 students attend classes on 12 campuses spread across Central Florida. The university consists of 13 colleges and employs more than 10,150 faculty and staff. Under Hitt's direction, UCF raised admissions standards, increased research funding, built new facilities, and established notable partnerships with major research institutions.

Hitt's efforts resulted in not only an increase in the university's academic profile, but also an on-campus football stadium, new arena, more on-campus housing, and the development of the UCF College of Medicine at Lake Nona. Until 1999, the Knights were represented by a jouster from the Medieval Times dinner show in nearby Kissimmee, Florida. That same year, Knightro was introduced at the staple homecoming event, Spirit Splash.

The past decade has seen enrollment increase by over 40%, the acceptance rate for first time in college students falling from over 60% to near 40% in 2008, and the doubling of expected annual expenses. Since 2000, UCF has awarded over 100,000 degrees. It is the largest university in the nation in terms of undergraduate enrollment, the largest university in Florida, and in 2003 was the fastest-growing university in the United States. During its Spring 2010 graduation ceremonies, UCF awarded its 200,000th degree, less than five years after awarding its 150,000th.

Colbourn Hall scandal 
In August 2018, the state university system's Board of Governors and the Florida Legislature opened an investigation into the university for misuse of state funds. On September 13, 2018, UCF admitted to misappropriating money intended for educational and operating expenses to build the new $38 million Trevor Colbourn Hall, leading to the resignation of CFO Bill Merck. In January 2019, UCF severed ties with President Emeritus John Hitt after the investigation proved that UCF had misspent or planned to misspend over $85 million between 2013 and 2018. Newly appointed president Dale Whittaker, who was a provost at UCF during Hitt's tenure, resigned in February 2019 after just seven months in office over allegations that he also knew about the misappropriation of funds. Board of Trustees Chairman Marcos Marchena also resigned that month. In August 2019, the final report into additional UCF construction projects revealed the balance of misdirected funds between July 2010 and August 2018 was $99.6 million (equivalent to $ million in ). The report found that key people in the university leadership of aware of the misdirection of the funds. UCF was fined by the state for 120% the cost of the misused funds.

During its brief history, UCF has hosted numerous notable speakers. Among these are U.S. presidents Richard Nixon, Bill Clinton, and Barack Obama, then senator and vice president Joe Biden, senators Bill Nelson, Marco Rubio, Mel Martinez, and John Edwards, Florida governors Jeb Bush and Charlie Crist, and First Lady Michelle Obama.

Campuses

Main campus
The University of Central Florida main campus is located along Alafaya Trail east of Orlando, Florida.

The campus is designed to be pedestrian-oriented, with a series of concentric circles. The outermost circle is Gemini Blvd, which is also the main road for vehicular traffic on campus. Inside of Gemini, there is Apollo Circle, Mercury Circle, and finally Pegasus Circle as the innermost circle. Pegasus Circle contains the student union, with the John C. Hitt Library located directly to the south of it. All academic buildings are located inside of Gemini, with the circle divided up into pie-shaped sections for each college. As there are very few roads inside of Gemini, many buildings' loading docks are accessible only by sidewalks and thus receive most deliveries at night. The University of Central Florida campus is one of only two in the nation with a concentric circle design, the other being the University of California, Irvine. Newsweek ranked UCF as having the 20th most beautiful university campus in the country in 2011.

Student housing is provided along the perimeter of the campus. Outside of Gemini, the campus is divided up into different themed sections. The northwest side of campus includes Greek communities, the north side contains Knights Plaza, an uptown style athletic village, the east side contains the Arboretum of the University of Central Florida, and the south side contains student recreation and wellness facilities.

Located directly south of the main campus is Central Florida Research Park, which is the seventh largest research park in the nation and the largest in Florida, housing over 116 corporations. The park provides more than 10,000 jobs to over 500 students and thousands of alumni.

Main Campus is one of the safest branches nationally in comparison of all branches in the US. The percent of crimes in Main Campus decreased from 0.12% (in 2010) to 0.07% (in 2014) crimes per year. The most common crimes detected on Main Campus were burglary, motor vehicle theft, and aggravated assault.

Regional campuses
In addition to its Orlando campus, the University of Central Florida has several other campuses to service the Central Florida region.

In Orlando, there is one other campus, located at Valencia West, as well as partnerships with local colleges, including College of Central Florida, Daytona State College, Eastern Florida State College, Lake-Sumter State College, Seminole State College of Florida and Valencia College.  In addition, the Rosen College of Hospitality Management is located away from the main campus, in close proximity to the heart of Orlando's tourism and convention industries.

Outside Orlando, there are campuses in Cocoa, Clermont, Daytona Beach, Kissimmee, Leesburg, Ocala, Palm Bay, and Sanford. In addition to having standard classes at these campuses, the institution offers a number of fully online degree programs through UCF Online.

UCF, in partnership with local colleges, participates in a program called DirectConnect. Through this program all students and alumni of College of Central Florida, Daytona State College, Eastern Florida State College, Lake-Sumter State College, Seminole State College of Florida, and Valencia College are assured admission to the university, though not necessarily to academic programs in the UCF colleges.

Health Sciences Campus at Lake Nona

The 50-acre (0.20 km2) UCF Health Sciences Campus at Lake Nona includes the UCF College of Medicine and the Burnett Biomedical Sciences Building. The Burnham Institute for Medical Research, a Veterans Affairs Medical Center, Nemours Children's Hospital, M.D. Anderson Cancer Research Institute, turning the area into a medical city. The campus will also serve as the future home of the UCF College of Nursing and the newly approved UCF College of Dental Medicine. The College of Medicine welcomed its charter class in August 2009.

Upon completion of construction, the campus could accommodate as many as 5,000 upper division, professional, and graduate students and faculty members in the health-related programs, and include up to two million square feet of research and instruction space.

Downtown Campus 
In 2019, a 15-acre campus was opened in downtown Orlando in collaboration with Valencia College. It includes the Dr. Phillips Academic Commons, the Union West, and the UCF Communication and Media Building.

Sustainability
Due to long-term environmental programs and commitments, UCF was named an exemplary green institution in the 2010 Princeton Review's Guide to 286 Green Colleges, and the university has had its initiatives showcased by the U.S. Department of Energy. UCF has pledged to become climate-neutral under the American College & University Presidents' Climate Commitment by 2050 at the latest, and to increase its recycling rate to 75% by 2020, and reduce carbon dioxide emissions by 42% by 2030. Committed to reducing greenhouse gas emissions, all new construction must be designed and certified by the U.S. Green Building Council's Leadership in Energy and Environmental Design (LEED). The UCF College of Medicine on the Health Sciences Campus is the only LEED Silver medical school in Florida.

Administration

As a part of the State University System of Florida, UCF falls under the purview of the Florida Board of Governors. The University of Central Florida is headed by the Board of Trustees, which governs the university, consisting of 13 appointed to staggered five-year terms by the Florida Board of Governors. The Student Government president and the faculty chair also serve on the board for the duration of their one-year terms of office.

The president of the University of Central Florida is the university's principal executive officer. The office was formed upon the university's creation in 1963. The president is appointed by the board of trustees with the consent of the Florida Board of Governors and leads the university through its daily business. Today, the president's office is in Millican Hall on the university's main campus, and the president lives in the Burnett House, also on the main campus. The fourth president of UCF, John C. Hitt, served from 1992 to 2018 and was succeeded by incumbent university president Dale Whittaker. After Whittaker resigned in 2019, Thad Seymour, Jr. was appointed from his previous position as UCF's vice president for partnerships and chief innovation officer to serve as the university's interim president until the board of trustees chould choose a replacement.

Due to cutbacks in federal, state and local budgets, UCF has had over $140 million in funds cut from its operating budget since 2008. This included a $53 million cut to UCF's 2012–13 fiscal year budget by the Florida legislature. So far UCF has endured the budget cuts by implementing a hiring freeze, ending some faculty perks, such as free seminars, cutting executive pay, and wise management of funds. To help counter the budget decreases, the university received $18 million in funds from the American Recovery and Reinvestment Act. UCF's operating budget for the 2014–15 fiscal year is $1.5 billion, a 13.9% increase from the previous year. UCF's financial endowment, administered by the University of Central Florida Foundation, Inc., was valued at $162 million in 2020.

Academics
The University of Central Florida is accredited by the Southern Association of Colleges and Schools. Its academic calendar is based on the semester system, with the typical fall semester running from the end of August until the beginning of December and the typical spring semester running from the beginning of January through the beginning of May. In addition, UCF offers four different summer semesters, A, B, C, and D, ranging from six to 12 weeks. The Carnegie Foundation for the Advancement of Teaching classifies UCF as a "large four-year, primarily nonresidential" university with a "comprehensive doctoral" graduate instructional program and "highest research activity."

Student profile

UCF's student body consists of 61,456 undergraduates and 10,002 graduate and professional students and 490 M.D. students from all 67 Florida counties, all 50 states and 157 countries. Study abroad programs allow UCF students to study and conduct research in 42 programs in 21 countries. The ten largest undergraduate disciplines at UCF are business management and administration, health professions and related, psychology, education, engineering, biology, multi/interdisciplinary studies, computer and information sciences, hospitality, and social sciences.

UCF;s enrollment has increased by over 60% this century, from 33,453 in 2000 to 64,318 in 2016. Of the more than 60,000 students, 11% are graduate and professional students, while women make up 55% of the student body. Nearly 20 percent of UCF faculty are minorities. According to the May 2009 edition of Hispanic Outlook in Higher Education magazine, UCF is one of the best 100 colleges in the United States for Hispanic students seeking bachelor's degrees.  22% of UCF students are above the age of 25.

Due to budget decreases and increased demands on the university, the UCF board of trustees, with the approval of the board of governors and the Florida legislature, approved a 15% increase in tuition for the 2012–13 academic year. For the 2020–21 academic year, undergraduate tuition costs were $212.28 per credit hour for in-state students and $748.89 per credit hour for out-of-state students. Graduate tuition costs were $369.65 per credit hour for in-state students and $1,194.05 per credit hour for out-of-state students. Tuition for the medical school is $25,490 for both in-state and out-of-state students. Estimated annual cost for undergraduate students is $22,2849 for Florida residents and $38,949 for non-Florida residents. Expected costs for graduate students are $22,072 for in-state students and $38,878 for out-of-state students. About 8% of tuition fees are allocated to support the university's athletic programs.

Rankings

For 2015, U.S. News & World Report ranked UCF as the third-best "up-and-coming" national university. In addition, U.S. News & World Report ranked The University of Central Florida as the 10th most innovative school, 91st among public universities, and 168th overall on the list of Tier I National Universities. Kiplinger rated UCF 42nd among the "Best Values in Public Colleges" in the United States in 2014. The university was also rated as one of "50 Best Value Public Universities" by USA Today and The Princeton Review. UCF is listed among "The Best 376 Colleges: 2012 Edition," and was ranked as a "Best Southeastern College" by The Princeton Review.
Many of the University of Central Florida's graduate programs have received top-100 rankings from U.S. News & World Report. In 2013, U.S. News & World Report ranked UCF's engineering, education, speech language pathology, public administration, criminology, healthcare, nursing, physics, physical therapy, space science, social work, speech-language pathology, and computer science programs all within the top 100 in their respective fields. Five UCF programs as among the nation's "Best Graduate Schools." U.S. News & World Report ranked the university's atomic, molecular, and optical physics program 13th nationally, the nonprofit management public affairs program 25th, and the counselor education program now breaking the top 10 at 9th in the nation. In 2012, the UCF College of Engineering and Computer Science was ranked 70th nationally, while the College of Education and Human Performance was ranked 64th, and the physics program was ranked 102nd in 2010. The Princeton Review ranked the Florida Interactive Entertainment Academy (FIEA) 2nd in graduate video game design in 2012.

The 2014 Academic Ranking of World Universities list assessed The University of Central Florida as among the top 300 world universities and the top 109 in the U.S., based on overall research output and faculty awards. UCF's engineering and business schools were rated among the top 150 and the university's social sciences, computer science, and mathematics programs among the top 200 globally. UCF offers both Army and Air Force Reserve Officer Training Corps (ROTC) programs, which are rated among the top 15% nationally. In 2010, Bloomberg BusinessWeek ranked the UCF College of Business Administration as the nation's best public business school for return on investment, and as a Top Undergraduate Business Program. The university has also been recognized by Bill Gates as a leading institution.

The University of Central Florida ranks eighth among national universities "least likely to leave graduates in debt," and was also ranked as one of the most economically diverse universities in 2009, 2010, and 2011 by U.S. News & World Report. In 2011, Forbes listed UCF as the 42nd most-affordable university in the nation. The university is also considered a top school in awarding degrees to minority students, ranking 12th nationally for total undergraduate degrees awarded to Hispanic students and 18th for undergraduate degrees awarded to African-American students.

Admissions

UCF's admission rate for first-time-in-college freshmen has declined from 61% of prospective students admitted in the Fall of 2005, to 42% for Fall 2020. Due to the decrease in the rate of admission, UCF is rated as a "selective" university by The Carnegie Foundation for the Advancement of Teaching.

34% of accepted applicants were in the top ten percent of their graduating class, while 72% of accepted applicants were in the top quarter of their high school class rankings. Freshmen enrolled in Fall 2020 posted average SAT scores of 1320, ACT scores of 28.7 and average high school weighted GPAs of 4.18. UCF is in the top 20 percent of universities in the nation for SAT average and the top 25 percent for GPA average. 71% of undergraduates receive financial aid. 90% of students receive scholarships through the Florida Bright Futures program. Forty percent of incoming freshman received Advanced Placement, International Baccalaureate, or an equivalent college credit upon entrance, while 30% of the freshman class received merit based scholarships. The retention rate of the 2010 freshman class was 87%.

More freshmen and transfer students applied to UCF during 2015 than any other public university in Florida, and UCF also awarded more bachelor's degrees than any other Florida public university that year. UCF is ranked 2nd in Florida, and 34th in the United States, by the number of National Merit Scholars enrolled. 335 National Merit Scholars enrolled at UCF for the Fall 2020 term.

Colleges

Overview

The university houses 13 colleges, which offer 101 baccalaureate programs, 88 master's programs, 31 doctoral programs, three specialist programs, and a professional program (medicine). In addition, 75% of the faculty have doctorate degrees, and 46% have tenure. The 13 colleges house 41 separate degree-granting departments and schools.

By enrollment, the three largest undergraduate units are the College of Sciences, the College of Business Administration, and the Health Professions and Sciences. At the graduate level, the College of Graduate Studies serves as the central administrative unit of graduate education at the university. Graduate students are also students of one of the other 12 colleges at the university. The university is seeking approval for a College of Dental Medicine, which would be housed at the Health Sciences Campus in Lake Nona.

The Burnett Honors College

The University Honors Program, administered by the Burnett Honors College is designed for 500 accomplished incoming undergraduates annually. Undergraduates enrolled in the Honors College participate in smaller classes with faculty, including individual research programs or assigned research in the area of a sponsoring faculty member. Another program offered by the college is Honors in the Major, which allows juniors and seniors to conduct original research within their major and write an undergraduate honors thesis. The latest Honors College incoming class had an average SAT score of 1373 and a 4.16 grade-point average. Honors students have the option to reside in a specifically designed living-learning community, composed entirely of honors students, in Tower III at Knights Plaza.

College of Medicine

The UCF College of Medicine was established in 2006 by the Florida Legislature and the Florida Board of Governors to increase opportunities for medical education in Florida. The College of Medicine welcomed its charter class of 41 students on August 3, 2009, and eventually will produce about 120 medical graduates a year.

With more than 4,300 applications for 41 available positions, UCF broke the state university record for most applications, and for 2009 it was the most selective medical school in the country. For the class of 2014, there were 3,761 applicants and only 60 were accepted. This initial class had the highest average MCAT score, 32.2, and GPA, 3.8, of any incoming class of medical students in the state. The inaugural class had a median age of 28, with 25% of the class composed of out-of-state students. The charter class completed their first year of courses on the UCF main campus, while the Lake Nona Medical City was completed. Every member of the inaugural class received a full scholarship, including tuition and basic living expenses, for their entire four years at the university, valued at over $160,000.

The university aims for the college to become a research-intensive medical school, with the aid of the Burnett School of Biomedical Sciences, The UCF Lake Lona Cancer Center, a Veterans Affairs Medical Center, Nemours Children's Hospital, Tavistock Group, and a M.D. Anderson Cancer Research Institute, all located on the College of Medicine's Lake Nona campus.

Rosen College of Hospitality Management

Located near the Orange County Convention Center on Universal Boulevard in Downtown Orlando, the college's  campus is designed to imitate a resort-style feel, with various areas of the college named for major donors to the college (e.g. Disney Dining Room, Universal Orlando Library, Darden Auditorium, and the state-of-the-art Anheuser Busch Beer & Wine Lab). The campus includes the Three Pillars Cafe, a student-operated cafe that serves various cuisines and food items. Regular Shuttle service is offered on most days that class is in session to and from the UCF Main Campus.

The college features an on-site Campus Life Office and Career Services Office that coordinate on-campus activities and career development events in conjunction with the UCF Student Government Association. In 2005, the university opened two on-campus housing buildings, able to house 400 residents. The college offers a variety of student organizations including associations such as Eta Sigma Delta (International Hospitality Management Honor Society), National Society of Minorities in Hospitality, the Professional Convention Management Association, and the National Association of Catering Executives, and the Global Association of Christian Hospitality Professionals. Rosen is currently ranked as the #5 Hospitality Management school in the nation (and the youngest of the top five programs so rated).

Limited access programs
Among the colleges, a number of undergraduate academic programs are termed "limited access programs" which are programs where student demand exceeds available resources thus making admission to such program competitive. Examples include academic programs taught under the Nicholson School of Communication and the music, theatre, dance, and medical laboratory sciences schools or departments. Students must apply to join these programs separately from admission to the university. Criteria for admission varies but is generally very selective and includes factors such as indicators of ability, performance, creativity, and talent. Arts programs require competitive auditions and have some of the smallest numbers of undergraduate majors in the university.

Libraries

The stated goal of the University of Central Florida libraries is to "support the research, teaching, learning and service commitments of students and faculty through widely-available access to collections of library resources, and to services to assist resource use."

UCF Libraries collections include over 2.2 million print volumes, 3.2 million microforms, 330,000 government documents, 10,000 full text electronic journal subscriptions, 660,000 e-books, 40,000 media titles, a base of 43,000 serial subscriptions, in addition to special collections and university archives materials. Notable collections within the library include the Bryant West Indies collection, the Van Sickle Leftist Pamphlet collection, the Book Arts Collection, collections of materials on tourism and hospitality, and materials on the history of Central Florida. UCF Libraries is a partner within the State University System of Florida Libraries.

Most of the print and media collection is housed in the John C. Hitt Library, which is located on UCF's main campus and is open to students, faculty and the public seven days a week. The library is five stories tall, and was the first academic building on campus. Leonardo Nierman's sculpture Flame of Hope is displayed outside the entrance to the building, and Nierman's stained glass Genesis window is exhibited on the third floor of the library building. In 2012, the main campus library was dedicated to honor John C. Hitt, UCF's fourth president, who at the time was celebrating his twentieth anniversary as university president. In addition to the John C. Hitt Library, Rosen College library, Downtown Library, Curriculum Materials Center, and the Harriet F. Ginsburg Health Sciences Library, UCF operates libraries at nine of its regional campuses throughout Central Florida.

The student newspaper, the Central Florida Future, at one time was housed on the upper floor of the library before moving to the Central Florida Research Park. In 1984, a complete renovation of the original library was undertaken, as well as an addition that more than doubled the size of the building. University president Trevor Colbourn dedicated the newly remodeled and expanded library in February 1985. A $64.4 million expansion of the Hitt Library, which would add  of space, as well as an Automated Retrieval System was recently approved by the university's Board of Trustees but may be delayed due to budget cuts.

Currently, the library is working on its 21st Century Library Project, a multi-phased plan designed to create additional space for student learning, technology, collaboration, and research expansion. The project upon completion will include the construction of a four-story automated retrieval center, increased quiet study space, and the creation of additional research and writing facilities on the fifth floor.

Research

The University of Central Florida fosters research among its thirteen academic colleges and schools, partnerships with corporations such as Lockheed Martin, Disney, Boeing, L3Harris, EA Tiburon, Siemens and SpaceX. UCF also houses a satellite campus at the Kennedy Space Center in Cape Canaveral, Florida. UCF is also a member of the Florida High Tech Corridor Council. The university has made noted research contributions to aerospace, optics, modeling and simulation, digital media, engineering and computer science, business administration, education, and hospitality management.

UCF is classified among "R1: Doctoral Universities – Very high research activity". According to the National Science Foundation, UCF spent $215.3 million on research and development in 2018, ranking it 107th in the nation. In 2009, UCF directly influenced 26,000 jobs and $1.96 billion in economic activity. When UCF's economic impact is combined with that of the Central Florida Research Park, the university and park influenced 46,000 jobs and $3.84 billion in economic activity in 2009. The new College of Medicine, which opened in August 2009, will create an estimated 30,000 local jobs and have an economic impact of $7.6 billion in its first few years.

Metropolitan Orlando sustains the world's largest recognized cluster of modeling, simulation and training companies. Located directly south of the main campus is the Central Florida Research Park, which is one of the largest research parks in the nation, providing more than 10,000 jobs. Research Park is the 7th largest research park in the nation, with 2,700 Department of Defense personnel and direct support contractors. Collectively, those defense organizations manage $5.2 billion in contracts every year. Many of the employees in Research Park work with UCF researchers and students on projects in the sciences, engineering, photonics and optics, modeling and simulation, and health-related fields.

The university also conducts research through numerous institutions and centers, including the Center for Research and Education in Optics and Lasers, Florida Solar Energy Center, Institute for Simulation and Training and Institute for Economic Competitiveness.

Student life
UCF has over 400 registered student organizations, intramural sports, and an active Student Government Association. The university encourages student activism through organizations such as the Office of Student Involvement, the Multicultural Student Center, the Campus Activities Board, Volunteer UCF and Learning and Interacting with New Knights (LINK), an organization that fosters freshman involvement. In 2011, UCF was ranked as the 9th best party school in the country by Playboy.  In 2006, High Times magazine ranked UCF among the top five counterculture colleges in the nation.

Traditions

Spirit Splash is a homecoming tradition at UCF, and is traditionally the only time during the year that students are allowed into the Reflecting Pond. It has been named the best college tradition in Florida by Florida Leader magazine, and among "The 20 Best College Traditions" by Business Insider.

Spirit Splash occurs the Friday before the Homecoming game, and serves as a pep rally where students descend into the pond to demonstrate school spirit. Spirit Splash began in 1995 when then-Student Body President Miguel Torregrossa was pushed into the Reflecting Pond by one of his cabinet members and fellow students followed suit. Along with the thousands of students who attend, there are members of the community, local dignitaries, alumni, children and even dogs who come to join in on the festivities. Knightro, the Marching Knights, cheerleaders, student athletes, and dancers all participate in the pep rally, usually followed by a concert. Spirit Splash was made possible in part by weight testing performed on the Reflecting Pond in preparation for President Richard Nixon's visit to the university to speak at its 1973 commencement. It was determined that the best way to protect the president would be to hold commencement in the pond itself, after being drained, so that Secret Service agents could be stationed on the roofs of the adjacent buildings.

One of the newest traditions on the UCF campus pertains to the Pegasus seal in the center of the main floor of the Student Union. From their first day on campus for orientation, new students are told to never walk on the Pegasus. As the tradition is told, those who step on the seal will never graduate from UCF. Usually the seal is roped off with heavy black velvet ropes, but when the ropes are not in place, students can be seen carefully avoiding the seal. In 2005, Florida Leader magazine named this new tradition the best college superstition in Florida.

Recreation

Many different recreational organizations and facilities are available on the UCF campus. Lake Claire is an on-campus lake with canoes, kayaks, and pedal boats available for rent (free to UCF students), and a small beachfront. In addition, UCF's Challenge Course is one of only five in the country to contain a high elements course.

UCF's main campus also boasts two Recreation and Wellness Centers. The main center is located on the south side of campus, adjacent to the Academic Village. The second gym is located in Knights Plaza on the north side of campus. The Centers are open to all students, and paid memberships are available for non-students. The Wellness Centers offer programs to boost students' understanding of their health, provides discounted blood and STD testing, staffs certified personal trainers, and teaches methods to maintain good health.

The main UCF Recreation and Wellness Center, which opened in 2002, is a  building that comprises five programs: Intramural Sports, Sport Clubs, Outdoor Adventure, Fitness, and Aquatics. The main recreation center includes a custom climbing wall with more than 20 different routes, as well as, tennis courts, sand volleyball courts, a disc golf course, numerous intramural sports fields, a leisure pool, and an outdoor lap pool. The Recreation and Wellness Center at Knights Plaza, which opened in 2013, is a  facility. It houses a cardio workout area, a circuit area, and a mind and body studio designed for group exercise.

Student government

The University of Central Florida's Student Government (UCF SG) is an advocacy group for the students who attend the university, representing the university's approximately 70,000 undergraduate, graduate, and professional students. It is the largest Student Government within the state of Florida and one of the largest in the United States. It also often places in the top ten student governments nationally for the services and outreach it provides for the students it serves. UCF SG operates within a multimillion-dollar budget. It funds and operates five campus departments—the Recreation and Wellness Center, the Office of Student Involvement, Student Legal Services, the A&SF Business Office, and the Student Union—while also providing around $1 million in funding to nearly 600 registered student organizations.

UCF SG was officially established in 1976 and consists of an executive, judicial, and legislative branch. The executive branch is headed by the student body president and student body vice president. Within the executive branch are between 15 and 20 appointed and paid cabinet members that oversee everything from safety and transportation on campus to governmental affairs. The student body president, by mandate of Florida law, serves on the university's board of trustees for a period of one year. The student body president and student body vice president are elected in annual elections held in the spring and both receive a paid salary that ranges from $15,000 to $19,000 per year. The legislative branch is composed of 70 senators elected each spring, and senators serve a one-year term in which they represent students in their respective colleges. Student senators annually elect a Speaker of the Senate, who receives an annual salary between $10,000 and $12,000 per year, and a Senate President Pro Tempore. Under state law, the Student Senate allocates the university's activity and service fee budget, which was $21.1 million in fiscal year 22-23. The judicial branch consists of a paid Chief Justice and 14 Associate Justices who preside over student conduct hearings and parking appeals.

Media
KnightNews.com is the only digital student newspaper serving the UCF community, and it operates without oversight from the university administration. KnightNews.com won the College Press Freedom Award in 2016 for its work fighting for open government.  A print newspaper, the Central Florida Future, was shutdown in August 2016. The Future, which also ran without university oversight, was one of the largest student-run newspapers in the United States. It focused on campus and local news coverage, but also featured national and international stories. The university itself publishes two magazines, Centric and Pegasus. Centric is the official student magazine of the university, and Pegasus is the official university magazine.

The university has operated WUCF-FM, a NPR station, since 1978. The station broadcasts Jazz that reaches Orange, Seminole, Osceola, Brevard, Lake and Volusia counties in central Florida. They broadcast an Internet program that is heard worldwide. In 2011, the university purchased WUCF-TV, which is Central Florida's only Public Broadcasting Service (PBS) television station. As the region's sole PBS affiliate, the station broadcasts to an estimated population of 4.6 million people in its aerial viewing area.

One limited access program at UCF is the Jazz Studies program, which launched a professional recording label for the university, Flying Horse Records. The program's faculty group, The Jazz Professors, and their student group, The Flying Horse Big Band, have both issued professional recordings since 2011 for the university label and all of which have charted in the top 50. The faculty group album "Do That Again" charted in the top 10.

Residential life

The university currently houses 11,000 beds on-campus in eight different housing communities. Residence hall style suites are available in the Libra, Apollo, Hercules, Nike, and Neptune communities. All of the residence hall suites have bathrooms shared between 2 or 3 rooms as opposed to communal bathrooms. Apartment-style housing is available in the Academic Village (Nike and Hercules) communities, the Towers at Knights Plaza, the Lake Claire Courtyard Apartments Community, and NorthView. UCF also has 400 beds at the Rosen College Apartments Community, located on the Rosen College of Hospitality Management campus. The majority of all on campus housing is occupied by freshman, though The Towers at Knights Plaza house mainly upper-classmen, student athletes, and honors students. Residents of the Towers Communities and Rosen College Apartments sign annual contracts to rent their apartments for a full academic year (fall, spring, and summer), whereas residents of all other standard housing communities on the main campus sign academic contracts to rent their rooms only for one or two semesters at a time. Housing on the main campus typically fills to capacity well before the start of the Fall semester, and cannot accommodate everyone who applies.

In addition, about 3,750 beds are available at the university-affiliated housing communities of Knights Circle and The Pointe at Central, which are off-campus apartment communities owned by The University of Central Florida Foundation, Inc. and managed by Asset Living. These communities contain many UCF services such as Resident Assistants, UCF Police service, reduced rent and offer shuttle service to and from campus on class days. The university also administers NorthView, which is owned and operated by UCF and located directly north of the main campus in Oviedo. NorthView houses 600 students, and includes a Hillel Jewish Student Center, a Catholic Student Center, and a common space for other faith based organizations to use.

Greek housing is also available on the main campus in the Greek Park community, which consists of close to 500 beds. There are ten sororities and three fraternities housed on campus, with eleven fraternities offering housing off campus.

Greek life

The Office of Fraternity and Sorority Life at The University of Central Florida is separated into five divisions: UCF Greek Council, Interfraternity Council, National Pan-Hellenic Council, Panhellenic Council, and the Diversified Greek Council. The Order of Omega has a chapter at the university.

The Interfraternity Council (IFC) comprises 18 fraternities, and the Panhellenic Council is made up of 12 sororities. In addition there are also many multicultural and honor Greek organizations. The Diversified Greek Council consists of 9 cultural organizations, four fraternities and five sororities. The National Pan-Hellenic Council comprises nine historically black organizations, five fraternities and four sororities. There are now also three recognized fraternal organizations for Christian students.

Greek life at the University of Central Florida involves more than 3,000 students in over 45 chapters. Approximately 11% of current undergraduate males and 9% of undergraduate females are members of either a sorority or fraternity.

The average GPA of Greek Life is higher than the overall university average. UCF's Greek Life won the inaugural Mid-American Conference Grade Point Average Award, which is given to the university with the highest Greek GPA above their campus' non-Greek GPA. In 2003, Florida Leader Magazine named UCF the university with the best Greek academics program in the state.

Mr. & Miss UCF

Since 1984 the Mr. & Miss University of Central Florida Scholarship Program has been providing scholarships and opportunities to UCF students. The program is open to all service-fee paying students at UCF who have at least a 2.5 UCF GPA. Auditions are held each year in September shortly after the fall semester begins and new titleholders are chosen in February. Mr. & Miss UCF make appearances all over Orlando and the Central Florida area, promoting their individual platforms as well as spreading school spirit and pride.

Athletics
The University of Central Florida features a large variety of intercollegiate athletics teams, known as the "UCF Knights", which compete in Division I of the National Collegiate Athletic Association (NCAA), and the American Athletic Conference (The American).

UCF fields 15 varsity teams, 6 men, and 9 women. Men's sports include baseball, basketball, football, golf, soccer, and tennis. Women's sports include basketball, cross country, golf, rowing, soccer, softball, tennis, track and field, and volleyball.

The Knights varsity teams have won numerous conference titles, and two national titles. UCF, as members of Conference USA (C-USA) between 2005 and 2013, were conference champions in football in 2007 and 2010, and women's basketball in 2009 and 2010. The women's volleyball team won the AIAW Small College Division national championship in 1978 (at the time the women's sports equivalent of NCAA Division II; the NCAA did not sanction women's sports until the 1980s), and the men's basketball team reached the Division II Elite Eight the same year. The Knights only other national championship was in 2017, when they were named national champions in football by the Colley Matrix. While they did not play in that season's College Football Playoff, they finished the 2017 season unbeaten. The Colley Matrix was the only NCAA-recognized selector to name UCF the national champions.

The UCF cheerleading team, which is a club sport, has also captured national titles. They have won three at the College Cheerleading and Dance Team Nationals, in 2003, 2007 and 2020. As the reigning national champions, the cheerleading team was followed by WE tv's cheerleading show, Cheerleader U in 2008.

The UCF varsity athletic program began during the 1969–70 academic year. Then known as the "Florida Technological University Knights of Pegasus", the university was a charter member of the Sunshine State Conference in 1975. Since the 1970s, the UCF athletic programs have become a major competitor in college athletics. Their development culminated in the mid-2000s, when the Knights joined C-USA in 2005 and debuted a new athletic village in 2007. Advertised as "Bringing the Knights home", the newly developed athletic village on the north end of campus known as Knights Plaza, consisted of a new 10,000-seat indoor sports venue now known as Addition Financial Arena, a new 44,000-seat football stadium known as FBC Mortgage Stadium, a new softball complex, and the only Division I indoor football practice facility in the state. The debut of the athletic village made UCF the first university to ever open a new stadium and arena during the same year. The athletic complex surrounding Knights Plaza also includes Jay Bergman Field, the UCF Soccer and Track Stadium and numerous practice facilities. To coincide with the opening of the athletic village, the university also debuted new athletic logos and an update to mascot Knightro.

The Knights football program began in 1979. UCF competed in the playoffs three times before ascending to the FBS level in 1996. The Knights have won two conference championships and four division titles. In UCF's first year in C-USA, the team experienced the fourth-best turnaround in NCAA history by winning the conference's eastern division and earning its first bowl berth in the 4th Annual Hawai'i Bowl. Celebrating their inaugural year in their new on-campus stadium, the 2007 UCF Football team won the C-USA Championship for the first time in the school's history and the eastern division for the second time in three seasons, securing a berth to the school's second bowl game, the 49th Annual AutoZone Liberty Bowl. During the 2010 season, for the first time in school history, the Knights garnered national rankings, finishing the season with a top–20 ranking. The Knights won the 2010 C-USA Championship game, securing a berth to the AutoZone Liberty Bowl in which the team earned their first-ever bowl victory, a 10–6 win over Georgia. In 2013, the Knights joined the American Athletic Conference (AAC) as a full member, won the conference's inaugural football championship, and upset the sixth-ranked Big 12 Conference champion Baylor Bears in the 2014 Fiesta Bowl. In 2017, the Knights finished with the only undefeated season in the FBS after a third AAC Championship win and a victory over the eighth-ranked Auburn Tigers in the 2018 Peach Bowl.

The UCF men's basketball team started in 1969 under head coach Torchy Clark. The Knights have advanced to the NCAA tournament ten times, including a trip to the Final Four in 1978. The program has won seven conference regular-season championships and five conference tournament titles. The 2008–09 UCF men's team featured senior Jermaine Taylor, who was one of the nation's top scorers averaging over 20 points per game. Following a 10–0 start to the 2010–11 season, and being one of nine unbeaten teams, the Knights led by coach Donnie Jones and guard Marcus Jordan were nationally ranked for the first time in program history. In the 2016-17 season, newly hired head coach Johnny Dawkins took the Knights to a semi-final berth in the NIT for the first time in school history. UCF was a layup away from advancing to the Sweet Sixteen and beating Duke, the consensus number-one seed, in the 2019 NCAA tournament, as Coach Dawkins, with his son on the team, faced off against his own previous coach, Mike Krzyzewski.

Notable alumni

Graduates include a prime minister, a Chairman of the Council of Economic Advisers, a United States assistant secretary of state, a Deputy assistant secretary at the Department of the Treasury, a Director of the National Reconnaissance Office, and a Director of the Secret Service; in addition many members of the Florida Cabinet, Florida House of Representatives and Florida Senate, two National Aeronautics and Space Administration (NASA) astronauts, along with various NASA leadership positions. Many officers in the armed forces have come through the Army and Air Force ROTC programs, Army, Navy, Marine Corps and Coast Guard Officer Candidate School, Air Force Officer Training School, Naval Aviation Officer Candidate School and Marine Corps Platoon Leaders Class. UCF graduates have held leadership positions in the United States Congress, United States Department of Defense, Army Corps of Engineers, and the Environmental Protection Agency.

Alumni have also achieved success as executives for many Fortune 500 companies, including Google, Boeing, Lockheed Martin, Northrop Grumman, Busch Entertainment Corporation, Harris Corporation, Darden Restaurants, Ericsson, the Orlando Magic and Texas Rangers, Sun Sports and Fox Sports Florida, Walt Disney Parks and Resorts, and Yahoo!. As a leader in technological education, UCF graduates are contributing greatly to Global innovation including Taylor Gerring co-founder of Ethereum
and Jason Eichenholz Co-founder of autonomous driving pioneer Luminar Technologies. 
UCF graduates have founded and contributed greatly to numerous successful companies including 
George Kalogridis, President of segment development and enrichment The Walt Disney Company.  Chris Marlin, Founder Lennar International. Christopher Tomasso, CEO First Watch (restaurant chain). Jason DiBona, CEO AreoClean Technologies.  
UCF graduates have also made notable contributions in the entertainment industry, including Cheryl Hines, widely known for her role as Cheryl David on the HBO television series Curb Your Enthusiasm; Daniel Tosh, host of Tosh.0 on Comedy Central; and Chris Fuller, the independent filmmaker behind Loren Cass. In addition, The Blair Witch Project, which is considered one of the most successful independent films produced, was filmed and directed by UCF alumni Daniel Myrick and Eduardo Sánchez. As a major competitor in college athletics, UCF has had notable student athletes, coaches, and staff members including NFL players Blake Bortles, A. J. Bouye, Daunte Culpepper, Shaquill Griffin, Shaquem Griffin, Brandon Marshall, Latavius Murray, Matt Prater, Asante Samuel and Kevin Smith; NBA players Jermaine Taylor, and Tacko Fall; wrestler Parker Boudreaux; woman's soccer player and Olympic gold medalist, FIFA Female Player of the Century Michelle Akers. As of 2019, more than 70 UCF alumni compete in professional sports like basketball, football, baseball, golf, and soccer.

Several UCF alumni work as professional journalists, for both local and national outlets. Christal Hayes covers the US Congress for USA Today. Derek Lowe covers South Florida for WPTV NewsChannel5. Ryan Bass is an anchor at WTSP in Tampa. The three journalists worked at the student media outlet KnightNews.com while they were UCF students.

Notable faculty

The faculty at UCF includes many notable and prestigious members, including two former United States ambassadors, a former member United States congressman, and a former vice president of Walt Disney Creative Entertainment, to name a few. Other faculty include winners of the Pulitzer Prize and Janet Heidinger Kafka Prize, the developer of the Flesch–Kincaid readability tests, and the authors of the Mathematical Circles and Political Analysis series. As a result of the work of professors and the Florida Space Institute, UCF will become the first Florida university to lead a NASA mission.

See also

Greater Orlando
State University System of Florida

Notes

References

External links

 Official website
 UCF Knights website

 
1963 establishments in Florida
American Athletic Conference schools
Educational institutions established in 1963
Universities and colleges in Orange County, Florida
University of Central Flolrida
Universities and colleges accredited by the Southern Association of Colleges and Schools
Robert A. M. Stern buildings